Khurja was a Lok Sabha parliamentary constituency in Uttar Pradesh.

Assembly Segments

1961-1976
 Jewar
 Khurja
 Chhatari
 Sikandrabad 
 Dadri

1976-2008
 Jewar
 Khurja
 Debai
 Sikandrabad
 Dadri (Noida area)

Members of Parliament

1962-2008

2008-Present
See Gautam Buddha Nagar Lok Sabha and Bulandshahr Lok Sabha seats.

See also
 Khurja
 List of Constituencies of the Lok Sabha

Former Lok Sabha constituencies of Uttar Pradesh
2008 disestablishments in India
Constituencies disestablished in 2008
Gautam Buddh Nagar district
Former constituencies of the Lok Sabha